Shantala Shivalingappa is an Indian Kuchipudi dancer.  Shivalingappa, a "child of the east and west", was born in Madras, India, and raised in Paris. She attended the international Jeannine Manuel School in Paris (then École Active Bilingue Jeannine Manuel) when she was young. Her gurus are Vempati Chinna Satyam and her mother, Savitry Nair, under whom she trained in Bharatha Natyam. She has worked with prestigious artists such as Maurice Bejart, Peter Brook, Bartabas, Ushio Amagatsu and Pina Bausch. Her performances have been praised throughout the world, and she tours extensively, hoping to increase international awareness of the Kuchipudi form. She is known for playing Solveig in Irina Brook's Peer Gynt.

References

Further reading
Sarah Kaufman, "Dance Review: Shantala Shivalingappa, a study in complexity and grace", The Washington Post, 13 March 2011
Claudia La Rocco, "Dance Review: Telling Tales Through Many Movements", The New York Times, 12 July 2010

External links 

Archival footage of Shantala Shivalingappa performing her work Shiva Ganga at Jacobs Pillow in 2010
Archival footage of a discussion on Classical South Indian Dance at Jacob's Pillow Dance Festival on August 9, 2008.
Archival footage of Shantala Shivalingappa performing her work Akasha at Jacobs Pillow in 2013

Kuchipudi exponents
Living people
Year of birth missing (living people)